Valentin Alexandrovich Dogiel (Russian: Валентин Александрович Догель, Valentin Alexandrovich Dogel)  (Kazan,  – Leningrad, 1 June 1955)  was a Russian and Soviet zoologist, specialized in parasitology and protozoology. He was a professor at the St. Petersburg / Leningrad State University since 1913, and head of the Laboratory of Protozoology at the Zoological Institute of the USSR Academy of Sciences, Leningrad, since 1944. In 1923 he founded the Laboratory of Parasitology at the Fisheries Research Institute VNIORKh in Leningrad.

Dogiel contributed significantly in the field of taxonomy of parasites and protozoa in general.
He also worked on more general questions of comparative anatomy and zoology, and summarized this work in the book Oligomerization of Homologous Organs (1954) which he presented his new theory of the evolution of the Metazoa. 

Dogiel's most famous work was the book Obshchaya protozoologiya (1951), also translated into English under the name General Protozoology in 1965. He was also the author of standard Soviet textbooks such as Invertebrate Zoology and Comparative anatomy of Invertebrates.

He was appointed a corresponding member of the USSR Academy of Sciences in 1939, and a foreign member of the Linnean Society of London in 1944.

Works
Dogiel, V. A. 1929. Polymerisation als ein Princip der progressiven Entwicklung bei Protozoen. Biologisches Zentralblatt 49: 451-469.
Dogiel, V. A. 1936. Oligomerisation of homologous organs as one of the processes of evolution of animal organisms. Arhiv Anatomii, Gistologii i Embriologii 15: 101-114. (Олигомеризация гомологичных органов как один из процессов эволюции животных организмов. Арх анат гистол эмбриол. 15: 101-114)
Dogiel, V. A. 1954. Oligomerization of the homologous organs as one of the main paths in animal evolution. Leningrad: Leningrad University Press [In Russian.] (Олигомеризация гомологичных органов как один из главных путей эволюции животных. — Л.: Изд-во ЛГУ, 1954. — 368 с.).

References

See also
Cecil Hoare
Bauer, Yu. Polianski, S. Willmott, O. (1982) O. V.A. Dogiel (1882-1953) - Systematic Parasitology, Volume 4, Number 3, p. 256

1882 births
1955 deaths
Russian people of Polish descent
20th-century Russian zoologists
Soviet zoologists
Russian parasitologists
Soviet parasitologists
Academic staff of Herzen University